Pierre-Paul Jouve (Marlotte, Seine-et-Marne, 16 March 1878 - Paris, 13 May 1973) was a French painter, sculptor  and illustrator. He was notable for his paintings and sculptures of Africa's animals. He was first recipient of the Prix Abd-el-Tif in 1907, and later of the Prix d'Indochine in 1921.

Biography 
Paul Jouve was two years old when his father set up his ceramist workshop on Boulevard Saint Jacques in Paris. It is in this artistic universe that he grew up playing with colors, modeling the earth, pampered by his young mother, who dreamed of making a teacher of her. Very early on, his father, seeing his passion for drawing, encouraged him, introduced him to the Jardin des Plantes, where he developed a passion for the big cats that he practiced drawing.

For the Universal Exhibition of 1900, the architect Binet, commissioned a frieze of wild animals of more than 100m representing tigers, bears, lions, bulls, and mouflons. This frieze will be executed in greenish brown glazed flamed sandstone by the sculptor Alexandre Bigot. Binet also ordered four lions from him to decorate the main gate of the Champs Elysees, between the two palaces, and a monumental statue representing a rooster wings outstretched in the center of the gate.

In 1907, Jouve was awarded a scholarship from the General Government of Algeria, and along with Léon Cauvy he was the first resident of Villa Abd-el-Tif in Algiers. The Contemporary Book Society commissioned him to illustrate Rudyard Kipling's Jungle Book, which was not published until 1919.

Winner of the General Government of Indochina travel grant, he is preparing a major trip to the Far East. In 1922, at the end of the summer, painter on a mission representing France, he embarked in Marseille, for a long journey of eleven months which will lead him successively to Indochina, China, Ceylon, then to India. He will stay in Angkor for nearly three months, fascinated by the beauty and grandeur of the site. He will bring back from this trip hundreds of studies which will serve him among other things to illustrate, Le Pellerin d'Angkor by Pierre Loti.

Gallery

References

External links
 

19th-century French painters
French male painters
20th-century French painters
20th-century French male artists
Animal artists
1878 births
1973 deaths
20th-century French sculptors
19th-century French sculptors
French male sculptors
19th-century French male artists